Wriston may refer to:

People
Henry Wriston
Walter Wriston

Other
Wriston, West Virginia, an unincorporated community in Fayette County